Affinity Equity Partners is one of the largest dedicated Asian private equity firms and focuses on leveraged buyout and growth capital transactions.

Affinity operates as a Pan-Asian firm focusing on investment opportunities in Korea, Southeast Asia, Greater China, Australia and New Zealand.

The firm is independently owned and operated, with founding partners who have worked together since 1998. It has over 80 employees with offices in Hong Kong, Singapore, Seoul, Beijing and Sydney.

History
Affinity is one of the early pioneer in Asian buyouts, having started private equity investing since 1998.  The team was originally known as UBS Capital Asia Pacific, and served as the Asian private equity arm of UBS AG. UBS Capital Asia Pacific was spun out as an independent firm in 2004.  Affinity is one of the largest independent Private Equity firms in the Asia Pacific region, and currently advises and manages approximately US$ 14 billion of funds and assets. Its latest fund, Affinity Asia Pacific Fund V of US$ 6.0 billion is one of the largest in the region.

Among Affinity's investments are or have been the following:

 Beijing Leader Harvest (China)
 Bojie Oriental Media (China)
 Burger King (Japan, Korea)
 Colorado Group Limited (Australia)
 Eastern Pacific Circuits (Hong Kong) 
 The Face Shop (Korea)
 First Engineering (Singapore)
 Haitai Confectionery (Korea)
 Hi-Mart (Korea)
 Inter office (Japan)
 IPAC Securities (Australia)
 Jaya (Singapore)
 Korea Digital Satellite Broadcasting (Korea)
 Kyobo Life Insurance Company (Korea)
 Kakao M (Korea)
 Loscam (Australia)
 Mando Corporation (Korea)
 MedicalDirector (Australia)
MK Electron (Korea)
 NS Electronics Bangkok (Thailand)  
 Oriental Brewery (Korea)
 Primo Smallgoods (Australia)
 PT Sido Muncul Tbk (SIDO) (Indonesia)
 Pulmuone Foods (Korea)
 RT Holdings (Hong Kong)
 Scottish Pacific Business Finance (Australia & New Zealand)
 SDL Leasing (Singapore) 
 TEG (Australia)
 Tegel Foods (New Zealand)
 United Test and Assembly Center (Singapore)
 Velocity Frequent Flyer (Australia )
 WiniaMando (Korea)

External links
Affinity Equity Partners (company website)

References

Investment banking private equity groups
UBS
Private equity firms of Asia-Pacific